Joseph Clifford McBride (January 1, 1909 — February 17, 1999) was a Canadian professional ice hockey player who played one game in the National Hockey League, with the Toronto Maple Leafs on December 25, 1929 against the Boston Bruins. Earlier references have him also playing one game for the Montreal Maroons, but that is not correct. The rest of his career, which lasted from 1927 to 1938, was spent in various minor leagues. He was born in Toronto, Ontario.

Career statistics

Regular season and playoffs

External links 
 

1909 births
1999 deaths
Canadian ice hockey defencemen
Cleveland Indians (IHL) players
London Panthers players
New Haven Eagles players
Pittsburgh Yellow Jackets (IHL) players
Ice hockey people from Toronto
Springfield Indians players
Syracuse Stars (IHL) players
Toronto Maple Leafs players
Toronto Millionaires players
Windsor Bulldogs (CPHL) players